The ASEA IRB is an industrial robot series for material handling, packing, transportation, polishing, welding, and grading. It was the world's first fully electrically driven and microprocessor-controlled robot, using Intel's first chipset.

The ASEA IRB was constructed by Björn Weichbrodt, Ove Kullborg, Bengt Nilsson and Herbert Kaufmann and was manufactured by ASEA in Sweden/Västerås. The first model, was developed in 1972–1973 on assignment by the ASEA CEO Curt Nicolin and was shown for the first time at the end of August 1973. The example shown in the Swedish National Museum of Science and Technology is the first robot that was sold. This robot was donated to the museum during ASEA's 100-year anniversary in 1983.

The IRB 6 sold 1900 copies during the next 17 years (1975–1992).  It became the Swedish symbol for a new Labour market, shared between man and robot.

The following part is the story of how the development of ASEA's industrial robot began, a project that resulted in the ASEA IRB became a school for virtually all industrial robots that were developed in the coming decades.

The seed of this industrial success came at the end of 1969 after Curt Nicolin, during a trip to the United States where he met Joe Engelberger who was a part-owner and led the main and leading manufacturer of industrial robots at that time, then hydraulically driven with simple point-to-point control systems. Curt Nicolin certainly thought that this could be something for ASEA to be interested in and then commissioned Wilmos Török ("Special Projects" Department) to initiate a preliminary study and the assignment was directly continued to Curt Hansson. As of an event, the time coincided with Intel's development of its first 4004 processors. To succeed in persuading Intel already in the beginning of 1971 to get a (one) chip from their preproduction, apart from the distinctive and unique mechanical design, has been the prerequisite for ASEA's IRB to form a school in this industry. The fact that ASEA was to create a single point to point robot was certainly not so interesting, so the connection to Intel and advanced control systems was the triggering factor for the project to get air under the wings. As a curiosity, it is mentioned that the processor was programmed using a machine-written manual with handwritten corrections and the long-awaited chip could be inserted into its circuit board, as expected for months on its processor chip.

Curt Hansson was responsible for the project until Aug 1976, except for a short period in which Björn Weichbrodt had the IRB-project management. In 1976, a series of IRB 60 was also prepared and ready for delivery, and a number of IRB 6 had already been delivered during the years before. The direct management of IRB operations was then taken over by Björn Weichbrodt that from there on he did turn it into the business success it obviously is today.

Notes 

Industrial robots
Robots of Sweden
ASEA